is a character in Frank Miller's Sin City graphic novel series. In the film adaptation of Sin City, she is portrayed by Devon Aoki. Jamie Chung replaces Aoki in the 2014 expansion, Sin City: A Dame to Kill For.

Character
Miho is a mute female assassin of Japanese descent (Miho is offended by anti-Japanese racial slurs, such as "Jap slut" and "Jap slag"; in response, she behaves in an even more sadistic way than she normally does). Along with Gail, she serves as an enforcer and defender of the city's Old Town. She is often referred to as "Deadly Little Miho" by the character Dwight McCarthy in his narrations. Despite residing in Old Town, there is nothing to suggest that she herself is a prostitute (contrary to the opinion expressed by some film critics such as Andrew Sarris and Ty Burr, as well as by IGN).

Miho is very small and light; she has long dark hair, a very slim figure, and dark eyes. Normally she dresses in a short, modified black kimono worn over a bra, and a belt into which she tucks all sorts of weapons. A wakizashi is sometimes shown hanging from her belt. In Family Values, her appearance changes drastically. She is drawn only with white and her body is devoid of shading (including her dark hair).

Miho uses Japanese swords of various sizes, and shuriken in the shape of the manji, as seen in The Big Fat Kill and Family Values. She is also skilled with the longbow and has various other small weaponry tucked in her clothing. She utilizes a wide array of weapons, such as katana, wakizashi and kusarigama. On the DVD commentary track for the film, Quentin Tarantino states that after he suggested that Miho's swords were made by Hattori Hanzō, writer/director Frank Miller enthusiastically agreed.

Much of Miho's past remains a mystery. Three years before the events of A Dame To Kill For, she was saved by Dwight during an attack by Tong gangsters. As Dwight himself explains to Goldie and Wendy, "three of the Tong who attacked Miho were dead by her hand. But the last two had her dead to rights. Point blank range." Because of this incident, she owes a debt of honor to Dwight. Subsequently, Dwight is the only male character she is ever shown to have any non-lethal interaction with, even taking orders from him at one point. They have some sort of friendship, as he is also the only character she ever shows any physical attraction or affection towards.

In a fight Miho typically uses her swords to "play" with her opponent (in Family Values Dwight likens her to a cat), often dodging her opponent's blows while hitting him/her (with seeming ease) in return. She would appear to be a modern-day master of traditional ninjutsu as she tends to rely on stealth, evasion, and counterattacks more than directly engaging an opponent. This puts to good use her acrobatic/gymnastic ability and knowledge of pressure points, veins, and arteries. She is also sometimes seen using roller-skates to get around, much as Carrie Kelley did as Catgirl in Batman: The Dark Knight Strikes Again, which was also written by Frank Miller.

Frank Miller has stated in the Sin City: Recut and Extended DVD commentary that Kevin and Miho are the supernatural beings in Sin City. Miller characterizes them as "demons"; Miho is a good "demon" and Kevin is an evil one. They share many similarities: they both never speak and are not even seen with their mouths open. They are the most skilled characters in martial arts (though they never fought Wallace), and never show any sign of pain. So far, Miho was never shown seriously injured and defeated all her opponents with relative ease, although Dwight stated in A Dame to Kill For that he rescued her from a hopeless situation with Asian Tong gangsters.

Appearances
Miho has appeared in four of the Sin City yarns (aside from the film adaptations):

A Dame to Kill For (1993) - After Dwight is shot multiple times and he discovers Ava Lord has been manipulating him to commit murder, he flees to Old Town. He seeks refuge from Gail, and in order to gain the help of the Girls of Old Town, he tells the story of saving Miho's life from Tong gangsters. As according to honor, the girls are obligated to help him in his plan for revenge. Miho is instrumental during the fight with Manute at Ava Lord's estate, stopping him from reaching Dwight and crucifying him through the arms with her twin swords. This leads Manute to have a great disdain for the Old Town girls.
The Big Fat Kill (1994-1995) - Miho is responsible for incapacitating and murdering Jackie Boy when he attempts to kidnap one of the Old Town girls. After Dwight discovers that Jackie Boy is a police officer, he attempts to prevent a war between the Old Town girls and the police by disposing of the body in the tar pits. Upon arrival, he is attacked by Irish mercenaries sent by Wallenquist, who steal Jackie Boy's severed head and leave Dwight to drown in the tar pits. As Dwight sinks beneath the surface of the pits, Miho dives in and rescues him.
The Babe Wore Red and Other Stories (1994)
Family Values (1997) - Miho and Dwight get involved in a mob war between the families of Don Magliozzi and Boss Wallenquist, after being told about a recent mob hit. Dwight is soon kidnapped by Vito, who is the nephew of Magliozzi, and is driven toward the Projects. Unknown to the hitmen is that Miho has been following Dwight to make sure that he is protected. Upon mention, Miho kills Spinelli, one of the goons, and they park in a hilltop rest area, overlooking the Projects. There, Miho "toys" with Vinnie, a hitman who spends the whole fight hurling slurs at her, as Dwight tells Vito to kill the other hitman, which is Vito's own brother Luca. After Miho and Dwight are through, they head straight to Sacred Oaks to confront Don Magliozzi, driven by Vito. Miho simply cuts through the guards and Dwight makes his appearance. He tells the Don he is going to die along with Vito for the accidental death of Carmen, one of the Old Town girls.

She was also supposed to appear in the video game adaptation of Sin City, which was canceled in 2008. An action figure based on the first film's version of the character was released by NECA.

Reception
In 2011, UGO Networks featured Miho in their list of "25 Hot Ninja Girls" and together with Kevin at #1 in "Quiet as the Grave: The Silent Killers of Film and TV".

References

External links
 Miho (comic book character) - Comic Vine

Characters created by Frank Miller (comics)
Comics characters introduced in 1993
Dark Horse Comics film characters
Fictional female assassins
Fictional characters from Washington (state)
Female characters in comics
Fictional kyūjutsuka
Fictional mute characters
Fictional female ninja
Fictional kenjutsuka
Fictional prostitutes
Fictional swordfighters in comics
Fictional women soldiers and warriors
Crime film characters
Sin City characters
Prostitution in comics
Vigilante characters in comics